Amina (died 1610) was a Hausa Muslim historical figure in the city-state Zazzau in present-day Nigeria.

Amina may also refer to:

People and fictional characters
 Amina (given name), including a list of people and fictional characters with the name

Film and television
Amina (1951 film), an Egyptian film
Amina (1957 film), a submission to the 30th Academy Awards for Best Foreign Language Film
Amina (2012 film), a Nigerian drama
Amina (2021 film)

Other uses
Amina (magazine), a French-language magazine 
Amina – Chechen Republic Online, or Amina.com, a social network service

See also

Amiina, an Icelandic band
Amin (disambiguation)
Iman (Islam)